Austrolittorina unifasciata, common name the banded periwinkle, is a species of sea snail, a marine gastropod mollusk in the family Littorinidae, the winkles or periwinkles. It is also known as the blue periwinkle.

Description

Distribution
This species is the only one of its genus found in Australia. It is distributed in the Coral Sea off Queensland, Australia and in the Indian Ocean off Western Australia. This common periwinkle also lives on the rocky shore of New Zealand. It is also commonly found in South Pacific Islands such as Norfolk Island.

Ecology
This species of periwinkle lives in the splash zone and high intertidal zone, where it is found in clusters of individuals. The banded periwinkle grazes on lichen and algae. This small snail is eaten by crabs and birds.

References

 Gray, J.E. 1826. Mollusca. pp. 474–496 in King, P.P. (ed.). Narrative of a Survey of the Intertropical and Western Coasts of Australia. Performed between the years 1818 and 1822; with Appendix B. London : John Murray Vol. 2 viii 637 pp., 9 pls
 Quoy, J.R.C. & Gaimard, J.P. 1833. Voyage de découvertes de l'Astrolabe, exécuté par ordre du Roi, pendant les années 1826–1829. Paris : J. Tastu Zoologie Vol. 2 pp. 321–686.
 Menke, C.T. 1843. Molluscorum Novae Hollandiae Specimen in Libraria Aulica Hahniana. Hannoverae : Libraria Aulica Hahniana pp. 1–46.
 Philippi, R.A. 1847. Abbildungen und Beschreibungen neuer oder wenig gekannter Conchylien. Cassel : Theodor Fischer Vol. 2 pp. 153–232
 Gray, M.E. 1850. Figures of molluscous animals, selected from various authors. London : Longmans, Brown & Green Vol. 4 124 pp
 Nevill, G. 1885. Hand List of Mollusca in the Indian Museum, Calcutta. Part 2. Gastropoda. Calcutta : Government Printer pp. 1–306
 Allan, J.K. 1950. Australian Shells: with related animals living in the sea, in freshwater and on the land. Melbourne : Georgian House xix, 470 pp., 45 pls, 112 text figs.
 W.J. Dakin – Australian Sea Shores; Angus and Robertson Publishers (1952)
 Iredale, T. & McMichael, D.F. 1962. A reference list of the marine Mollusca of New South Wales. Memoirs of the Australian Museum 11: 1–109 
 Macpherson, J.H. & Gabriel, C.J. 1962. Marine Molluscs of Victoria. Melbourne : Melbourne University Press & National Museum of Victoria 475 pp.
 Rosewater, J. 1970. The family Littorinidae in the Indo-Pacific. Part I. The subfamily Littorininae. Indo-Pacific Mollusca 2(11): 417–506 
 Branch, G.M. & Branch, M.L. 1981. Experimental analysis of intraspecific competition in an intertidal gastropod Littorina unifasciata. Australian Journal of Marine and Freshwater Research 32: 573–589
 McKillup, S.C. 1981. Avoidance of the Predatory Whelk Lepsiella scobina albomarginata by Littorina cincta and Littorina unifasciata. The Veliger 24(2): 167–171
 Reid, D.G. (1989) The comparative morphology, phylogeny and evolution of the gastropod family Littorinidae. Philosophical Transactions of the Royal Society of London, Series B 324: 1–110
 McMahon, R.F. 1992. Microgeographic variation in the shell morphometrics of Nodilittorina unifasciata from southwestern Australia in relation to wave exposure off shore. pp. 107–117 in Grahame, J., Mill, P.J. & Reid, D.G. (eds). Proceedings of the Third International Symposium on Littorinid Biology. London : Malacological Society of London.
 Wilson, B. 1993. Australian Marine Shells. Prosobranch Gastropods. Kallaroo, Western Australia : Odyssey Publishing Vol. 1 408 pp.
 G.J. Edgar, Australian Marine Life ; Reed New Holland Publishers (1997)
 Reid, D.G. & Williams, S.T. (2004) The subfamily Littorininae (Gastropoda: Littorinidae) in the temperate Southern Hemisphere: the genera Nodilittorina, Austrolittorina and Afrolittorina. Records of the Australian Museum 56: 75122.

External links
 
 Image of a cluster of individuals: 
 Historical descriptions and illustrations:
 Gray, John Edward (1826). "Mollusca" (Part of "Appendix B: containing a list and description of the subjects of natural history collected during Captain King's survey..." in King, Phillip P. Narrative of a survey of the intertropical and western coasts of Australia.). Species 48, p. 483.  
 p. 479
  Figures 8–11. 

Littorinidae
Gastropods described in 1826
Taxa named by John Edward Gray